Mokilko, or Mukulu (also known as  Gergiko, Guerguiko, Mokulu, Mokoulou, Djonkor Guera, Dyongor Guera, Diongor Guera, Jonkor-Gera), is a Chadic language spoken in central Chad. The local name for the language is Gergiko (or Geurguiko in the French orthography). This is the name used for mother-tongue literacy materials. Mukulu is the name of a village.

Notes

References
 Adwiraah, Eleonore. 1991. A comparative analysis of two Chadic tales. Afrika und Übersee 74:39–48.
 Blažek, Václav 1994. Toward Determining the Position of Mokilko within Chadic (a Lexicostatistic Analysis). In: Bearth et al. (eds.). Perspektiven afrikanischer Forschung (X. Afrikanistentag), 69–72. Köln: Köppe.
 Fédry, Jacques. 1977. Aperçu sur la phonologie et la tonologie de quatre langues du groupe “Mubi-Karbo” (Guéra): dangaléat est, dangaléat ouest, bidiyo, dyongor. In: Jean-Pierre Caprile (ed.), Études phonologiques tchadiennes, 87–112. Paris: Société des Etudes Linguistiques et Anthropologiques de France (SELAF).
 Jungraithmayr, Herrmann. 1977a. Das Verb im Mokulu und das Alttschadohamitische Aspektsystem, In: W. J. G. Möhlig, Frans Rottland and Bernd Heine (eds.), Zur Sprachgeschichte und Ethnohistorie in Afrika (Festschrift O. Köhler), 81–90. Berlin: Dietrich Reimer.
 Jungraithmayr, Herrmann. 1977b. Grundzüge des Verbalsystems des Mokilko, der Sprache von Mokoulou (Guéra, Tschad). Africana Marburgensia 10(1), 68–82.
 Jungraithmayr, Herrmann. 1977c. Grundzüge des Verbalsystems des Mokilko, der Sprache von Mokoulou (Guéra, Tschad) [part 2]. Africana Marburgensia 10(2): 3–12.
 Jungraithmayr, Herrmann. 1977d. Zum Verb im “Mokulu”. In: W. Voigt (ed.), XIX Deutschen Orientalistentag vom 28 September bis 4 Oktober 1975 in Freiburg im Breisgau: Vorträge. Wiesbaden: Franz Steiner Verlag.
 Jungraithmayr, Herrmann. 1982. Le fonctionnement du verbe dans l'énoncé simple en mokilko. In: Herrmann Jungraithmayr and Henry Tourneux (eds.), Fonctionnement du verbe dans trois langues tchadiques, 25–29. Marburg.
 Jungraithmayr, Herrmann. 1983. Verbe et pronom d'objet infixé en mokilko (Tchad). LACITO Informations 14:91–95.
 Jungraithmayr, Herrmann. 1987a. La formation de classes verbales en mokilko et en mubi. In: Herrmann Jungraithmayr and Henry Tourneux (eds.), Etudes tchadiques, Classes et extensions verbales. Paris: Geuthner.
 Jungraithmayr, Herrmann. 1987b. Quelques extensions verbales en mokilko. Herrmann Jungraithmayr and Henry Tourneux (eds.), Etudes tchadiques, Classes et extensions verbales. Paris: Geuthner.
 Jungraithmayr, Herrmann. 1990. Lexique mokilko. Berlin: Dietrich Reimer.
 Jungraithmayr, Herrmann. 2003. Pi' 'el/parras/fa' 'al in Chadic? In: M. Lionel Bender, Gábor Takács and David L. Appleyard (eds.), Selected Comparative-Historical Afrasian Linguistic Studies: In Memory of Igor M. Diakonoff, 317–323. Munich: LINCOM Europa.
 Jungraithmayr, Herrmann. 2004. L'idéophone en mokilko et en sibine: différences morphologiques et sémantiques. In: Élisabeth Motte-Florac and Gladys Guarisma (eds.), Du terrain au cognitif: Linguistique, ethnolinguistique, ethnosciences. À Jacqueline M.C. Thomas, 181–195. Leuven/Paris: Peeters.
 Jungraithmayr, Herrmann. 2005a. Le paradigme verbal en -U dans les langues chamito-sémitiques. In: Antoine Lonnet and Amina Mettouchi (eds.), Les langues chamito-sémitiques (afro-asiatiques), vol. 1, 65–80. Paris: Ophrys.
 Lukas, Johannes. 1974. Ein Text in der Sprache der Djonkor des Gera-Massivs (République du Tchad). Afrika und Ubersee, 212–226. Berlin: Dietrich Reimer.
 Lukas, Johannes. 1977. Beiträge zur Kenntnis des Mukulu (Rép. du Tchad). Tschadische Studien, I. Afrika und Übersee 60, 1–58, 192–229.
 Roberts, James. 1999. Feature spreading in Mukulu nouns plurals. N’Djamena: Université de N’Djaména/SIL. Manuscript.
 Sharp, David. 1997. The phonology and morphology of Mukulu verb forms. N’Djamena: SIL. Manuscript.

East Chadic languages
Languages of Chad